Xigua (西瓜) means watermelon in Chinese. It may also refer to:

 Xigua Video, a Chinese video platform